Ahn So-young (Hanja: 安昭映) (born August 12, 1959) is a South Korean actress. Ahn was born in Seoul in 1959 and graduated from Jeonghwa Girls' Commerce High School. Ahn debuted in 1979 with Naeil tto naeil (Again Tomorrow) directed by Im Kwon-taek and entered stardom with Madame Aema in 1982.

Filmography
*Note; the whole list is referenced.
'

Television shows

Awards
1982 the 13th Baeksang Arts Awards : New Film Actress for Madame Aema

References

External links

1959 births
Living people
Actresses from Seoul
South Korean film actresses
South Korean Buddhists